The 2022 season was the 108th season in the existence of Clube Atlético Mineiro and the 16th consecutive season in the top flight of Brazilian football. In addition to the national league, Atlético Mineiro participated in this season's editions of the Campeonato Mineiro, the Copa do Brasil, Copa Libertadores and the Supercopa do Brasil.

Players

Other players with first team appearances

Transfers

In

Out

Loans out

Transfer summary
Undisclosed fees are not included in the transfer totals.

Expenditure

Total:  €1,450,000 

Income

Total:  €24,746,500

Net total

Total:  €23,296,500

Competitions

Overview

Campeonato Mineiro

First stage

Matches

Knockout stage

Semi-finals

Final

Copa Libertadores

Round of 16 

The draw for the round of 16 was held on 27 May 2022.

Quarter-finals

Campeonato Brasileiro

Standings

Result by round

Matches

Copa do Brasil

Third round

Round of 16

Supercopa do Brasil

Atlético Mineiro qualified for the 2022 Supercopa do Brasil by winning the 2021 Campeonato Brasileiro Série A and the 2021 Copa do Brasil.

Statistics

Squad appearances and goals

|-
! colspan="16" style="background:#dcdcdc; text-align:center"|Goalkeepers

|-
! colspan="16" style="background:#dcdcdc; text-align:center"|Defenders

|-
! colspan="16" style="background:#dcdcdc; text-align:center"|Midfielders

|-
! colspan="16" style="background:#dcdcdc; text-align:center"|Forwards

|-
! colspan=16 style=background:#dcdcdc; text-align:center|Players who have made an appearance this season but have left the club

|}

Notes

References

External links

Clube Atlético Mineiro seasons
Atlético Mineiro